Gilbert Kennedy of Dunure, 1st Lord Kennedy (22 February 1405 – 27 March 1489) was a Scottish lord, a son of Sir James Kennedy, Younger of Dunure, and Lady Mary Stewart, daughter of Robert III, King of the Scots. He served as one of six Regents during the early reign of James III of Scotland, after the 1460 death of James II.

Personal life
Gilbert married Catherine Maxwell, daughter of Herbert Maxwell, 1st Lord Maxwell.
 John Kennedy, 2nd Lord Kennedy, father of David Kennedy, 1st Earl of Cassilis.
 Catherine Kennedy, mother of Hugh Montgomerie, 1st Earl of Eglinton.
He married, secondly, after 1460, Isabel Ogilvy, daughter of Sir Walter Ogilvy of Lintrathen and Isabel Glen, and widow of Patrick Lyon, 1st Lord Glamis. In 1484 she sued John Kennedy for silverware which he claimed to have bought from Gilbert Kennedy, 1st Lord Kennedy. Gilbert was then said to be deceased.

Offices and titles
Kennedy, created 1st Lord of Kennedy between 27 March 1457 and 20 March 1458, in addition held the office of Keeper of the Castle of Lochdoun and the office of Constable of Stirling Castle, bestowed upon him in 1466. By that time, he was already Regent of Scotland, having secured the position on the death of James II.

Ancestry

See also
Marquess of Ailsa

References

External links
Stirnet: Kennedy01 (Gilbert is near the top of the page)
thePeerage.com: Gilbert Kennedy of Dunure, 1st Lord Kennedy

1405 births
1489 deaths
15th-century Scottish people
15th-century viceregal rulers
Regents of Scotland
Gilbert
Lords of Parliament (pre-1707)
Peers created by James II of Scotland